Fagus is the genus of trees commonly known as beech.

Fagus may also refer to:

 Fagus (god), a god of beech trees in Celtic mythology, especially in Gaul and the Pyrenees
 Fagus, Missouri, named for the beech
 The Fagus Factory, a German architectural landmark of 1913
 9021 Fagus, an asteroid